The Norfolk mayoral election of 2006 took place on May 2, 2006. Voters elected the Mayor of Norfolk. This was the first popular election for mayor of Norfolk since 1916. It saw the reelection of incumbent mayor Paul D. Fraim.

Results

References 
 

2006 Virginia elections
2006 United States mayoral elections
2006